The Hunter 45 and Hunter 45 Legend are a family of American sailboats, that was first built in 1985.

The series is often confused with the much later Glen Henderson-designed 2005/2006 Hunter 45 DS and Hunter 45 CC.

Production
The boat series was built by Hunter Marine in the United States, but it is now out of production. The Hunter 45 was produced from 1985 to 1987.

Design
The Hunter 45 series are all recreational keelboats, built predominantly of fiberglass.

Variants
Hunter 45
This model was designed by Warren Luhrs and introduced in 1985 and built until 1987. The boat is fitted with an inboard diesel engine. The standard keel-equipped boat has a PHRF racing average handicap of 105. The wing keel-equipped boat has a PHRF racing average handicap of 90 with a high of 78 and low of 105.
Hunter 45 Legend
A derivative of the Hunter 45, this model was also designed by Warren Luhrs and introduced in 1985. The boat is fitted with a Japanese Yanmar diesel engine. The boat has a PHRF racing average handicap of 72 with a high of 84 and low of 66.

See also
List of sailing boat types

Similar sailboats
C&C 45
Hunter 456
Hunter 460
Hunter 466
Hunter Passage 450

References

External links
Hunter Legend 45 official brochure

Keelboats
1980s sailboat type designs
Sailing yachts
Sailboat type designs by Warren Luhrs
Sailboat types built by Hunter Marine